Eliza Wyatt is an American playwright born in England, who has been part of the Boston theater scene for more than thirty years.

Life and career
Eliza Wyatt completed an undergraduate degree at Boston University in Philosophy and Master of Arts degree in play-writing at Brandeis University. She has had plays produced in Boston, New York City, Los Angeles, London, Ankara, Edinburgh and regional theatres to many favorable reviews. Her plays are politically inspired by contemporary life-problems but follow the classic form of tragedy and comedy.

Wyatt has a number of interests, and has recently devoted herself to sculpture.

Works

Full length plays
Wyatt's plays have been produced internationally. Selected works include:
Angela Hitler (The Housekeeper) (1986), became a Susan Smith Blackburn finalist and received the Double Image Helen Warren Meyer production award.
Chronic Competition (2000)
Nuncle (2001)
Techno-frantic Love (2002)
Gods & Goddesses (2004)
Flowers of Red (2005/2006)
Sleep Around Beauty a collaboration with Paul Chi, was the first musical to be video-streamed in 2007 from Pete Townshend’s Oceanic Studios. (Part of the Planet Tree Music Festival, London 2007)
Alice's World (2009)
Alice Leaves the Garden (2011) 
Feeding the Beast
Blue Sky Thinking
Mirror Images
Having a Life
The Assassination of Robert F. Kennedy

One act plays
Selected works include:
Bunny (premiered at New Venture Theatre, Brighton, subsequently produced as a short film directed by Brian Kaufman)
Suicide Queens
One-Acts by Wyatt
The Right Decision
Troubadour Line
Hunt for Lizards
Mobiles
At Home with Hume
The Accident
Monologues for Women

Prizes and awards
Best Playwright Edinburgh Fringe Theare Festival, August 2005, awarded for "Flowers of Red"
First place in Children's Theatre Category of Moondance International Film Festival in 2011 for Moondance
Moondance International Film Festival's Columbine Award in 2002 for the radio play, One,Two, Beep....
Winner at the International Center for Women Playwrights in 2003 for Shut Door. 
Double Image Helen Warren Meyer Production Award for Angela Hitler
Playwrights Platform's Playwrights As Thinkers Award
Massachusetts’ Playwrighting Fellowship
Eugene O’Neill Playwrights Conference
Mid-West Playwrights Conference

Publications
Wyatt is a published playwright. Published plays include:
Mirror Images, Athena Press, L.A.
Blue Sky Thinking, Literature International

Affiliations
Roxbury Outreach Shakespeare Company, Boston
Playwrights Platform - Founder of the Playwrights Platform One Act Play Festival, Boston
New York Public Library Archive
National Black Theatre Company of England
International Centre for Women Playwrights
Healthy Concerts, Brighton, England

References

External links
Eliza Wyatt playwright site
Eliza Wyatt sculpture site

Year of birth missing (living people)
Living people
People from Brighton
English dramatists and playwrights
American screenwriters
American women dramatists and playwrights
21st-century American women